Madhyandina Shakha is a shakha (branch) of Shukla Yajurveda. This branch includes Madhyandina Samhita, Madhyandina Shatapatha Brahmana, Ishavasya Upanishad and Brihadaranyaka Upanishad. Recitation of this Shakha is prevalent over most of North India, Maharashtra and among Veda pandits of Gujarat.

Traditions
Many north Indian Veda Pandits recite it in a different way compared to those from Maharashtra. Many of the former pronounce the syllable ष (ṣa) as ख (kha).

A large number  of Shukla Yajur Vedic Mandyandina Shakha Brahmins are residing in Nashik, Maharashtra and many in Bihar (Maithil Brahmins except those belonging to Shandilya Gotra), Bengal and Uttar pradesh too. An association has also been formed with 3000 members on its roll.
And a large number reside in Nepal. Estimates over two hundred thousand. Many have immigrated to USA.

See also
Kanva Shakha
Vajasaneya Shakha

References
of scholars of Madhyandina Shakha

Vedas